Andy Tillison (born 21 June 1959) is a British keyboardist and singer best known for his work in the progressive rock bands Parallel or 90 Degrees and The Tangent.

Biography
Tillison and guitarist/vocalist Guy Manning had an early unsigned band called Gold Frankincense & Disk Drive. The band's final line-up also included Hugh Banton on organ and Dave Albone on drums. One piece by this line-up, "A Gap in the Night", was later included on Parallel or 90 Degrees' The Corner of My Room, followed by the archival release No More Travelling Chess.

Tillison and Manning then formed a new band, Parallel or 90 Degrees, with Sam Baine also on keyboards. With Manning temporarily unavailable, Tillison and Baine recorded The Corner of My Room, subsequently released as the band's second album.

A new line-up of Parallel or 90 Degrees signed with Cyclops Records with Tillison, Baine, Lee Duncan (drums), Jonathan Barrett (bass) and Graham Young (guitar). Young was later replaced by Gareth Harwood. The band released Afterlifecycle (1997) and The Time Capsule. With Alex King on drums and Ken Senior on bass, the band then released Unbranded. Harwood was replaced by Dan Watts for More Exotic Ways to Die.  Following a break to work on other projects, 2009 saw PO90 return with the album "Jitters". 
King and Watts are currently working on a band called British Fiction.

Meanwhile, plans for a solo album by Tillison transformed into the first The Tangent release, The Music That Died Alone (2003). The line-up included Roine Stolt, Jonas Reingold and Zoltan Csorsz from The Flower Kings, David Jackson from Van der Graaf Generator and Guy Manning. See main article on The Tangent.

External links
Parallel or 90 Degrees official website
The Tangent official website
2003 interview with Tillison
2004 interview with Tillison
2010 interview with Tillison

British rock keyboardists
Living people
The Tangent members
1959 births